Ferrys was a Spanish professional cycling team that existed from 1960 to 1968.

References

External links

Cycling teams based in Spain
Defunct cycling teams based in Spain
1960 establishments in Spain
1968 disestablishments in Spain
Cycling teams established in 1960
Cycling teams disestablished in 1968